is a Japanese pop singer and dancer. She is an 11th-generation member of the pop group Morning Musume. Prior to joining Morning Musume, Oda was a Hello! Pro Egg member.

Career
In the summer of 2011, Sakura Oda took part in the S/mileage 2nd generation audition, but did not pass. In November 2011, she was added to Hello! Pro Egg, a Hello! Project trainee group, which was later renamed "Hello! Pro Kenshūsei".

In the middle of 2012, Sakura Oda participated in the 11th generation audition for Morning Musume, in which 7,000 applicants took part. She advanced to the final round, with 5 other girls. On 14 September 2012, at a public dress rehearsal of Morning Musume 15th Anniversary Concert Tour held at Harmony Hall Zama in Kanagawa (Sakura's home prefecture), it was announced that Sakura Oda was the only one chosen to join the group.

Personal life
Her nickname in Hello! Pro Kenshūsei is Sakura. She admires Ai Takahashi and Risa Niigaki in terms of singing, and Saki Nakajima from Cute in terms of dancing.

Hello! Project groups
 Hello! Pro Egg (2011–2012)
 Morning Musume (2012–present)
 ODATOMO (2014–2016)

Discography
 For Sakura Oda's releases with Morning Musume, see Morning Musume discography.

Solo DVDs and Blu-rays

Bibliography 
Oda's photobook "モーニング娘。’19 小田さくら写真集 さくらのきせつ" (out in March 2019) reached the top 10 of the Oricon photobook chart.

References

External links
 
 
 Morning Musume official profile

Japanese women pop singers
Living people
Morning Musume members
Japanese female idols
1999 births
People from Zama, Kanagawa
Musicians from Kanagawa Prefecture